LiLi Roquelin is a French-American singer, songwriter, composer, record producer from Astoria, Queens, New York City. Roquelin is most notable for her songs which won Best Music Video at several film festivals and received TV and Film placements.

Early life 
Roquelin was born in Toulon, France, and grew up on The French Riviera (known in French as La Côte d'Azur), learning music at a very young age. She played several gigs as a teenager, both solo and in various bands. She then left France to pursue a career in the United States. She moved to the Cleveland-Akron area of Northeast Ohio, and fronted Phizzy Lager and then the alternative hard-rock Kent, Ohio band Hate Dies Hard, and released with them in 2006 an album entitled Neverending Sundown and engineered by Bill Korecky (Mushroomhead's Producer).

Career 
Roquelin was introduced to producer Sean Bilovecky (Disengage), who collaborated with her on "I Saw You". Later that year, Roquelin moved to New York City. The music video for "I Saw You" was included in her self-titled EP and won Best Music Video at the Queens (NY) International Film Festival in November 2008 and Best Music Video at the 2009 Indie Gathering Film Festival.

Roquelin recruited Marc Urselli a three-time Grammy Award-winning engineer to mix and master the recordings from her EP and launched an online crowdfunding campaign to help cover the expenses of the EP, a recording of down-tempo, trip hop songs composed by Roquelin with lyrics in English and French accompanied by her piano arrangements. "Blues Alone" received an Honorable Mention at the 2009 John Lennon Songwriting Contest.

Roquelin released a full-length album Will you hate the rest of the world or will you renew your life? and a music video for "Should You Get Mad" in February 2010. The video was directed by Arnaud Muller (U2) at RNO Pictures and was in the official selection of ZFF Film Festival (London, Miami, LA). It was runner-up in the Best Music Video in pop category at the 2010 Indie Gathering Film Festival and Convention. The album also includes a cover of Danny Elfman's "Sally's Song" (from Tim Burton's The Nightmare Before Christmas) in French.

Her influences are The Beatles, Radiohead, Noel Gallagher, and Ingrid Michaelson. Roquelin performed at One Penn Plaza in NYC for the 9-11 commemoration and has played various venues including The Bitter End in NYC.

At the end of June 2012, LiLi Roquelin was working on finishing up her 3rd solo studio album. Her previous records landed her diverse placements in documentaries and films such as the soundtrack of Attack of La Nina by Matchstick Productions.

LiLi Roquelin released a new album, Beautiful Sun, in December 2012. On 31 January 2013 she premiered the music video for her song "Thank You". There is also a mini-documentary on the making of "Beautiful Sun". Her music on "Beautiful sun" melds the two worlds of adult contemporary and exploratory pop. The songs are described as Blue, jazz-influenced trip hop (title track), gritty-guitar progressive arrangement ("Try to remember"), minor key pop song with inflections of the blues ("Don't Wait"), recalling the works of Sarah McLachlan, Kate Bush, Tori Amos. Some of the musicians on "Beautiful Sun" are cellist Christopher Marion, guitarist and bassist Askold Buk (Hayley Westenra, Hugh Masekela). She composed and arranged all of the music on the album and recruited Grammy winning mixing engineer Marc Urselli and Roman Vail, mastering engineer at JLM Mastering Studios (Moby, Sinead O'Connor, The Black Crowes).

Lifetime's show Dance Moms used Roquelin's song "Renew" for a dance routine entitled "Sinful" (season 1, episode 9, first air-date 09/07/11). The show used another of her songs "Keep This For You" for a Hunger Games-inspired dance routine called "The Huntress" on Dance Moms season 2 episode 17 - Lifetime (first aired on 06/26/2012). Her song "Blues Alone", from her 2008 solo EP, was her third featured track on the show ("Return to Grace", season 3 episode 14, first aired 2 April 2013) for the main group dance routine. The album Beautiful Sun was reviewed in The Los Angeles Examiner and The Aquarian Weekly.

In September 2013 Roquelin was welcomed by the National Academy of Recording Arts and Sciences (The GRAMMYs) as a Voting Member. On 26 September 2013, LiLi Roquelin was invited to perform God Bless America at a corporate event at the elegant Terrace on the Park in New York City.

On 21 November 2013 she premiered her new music video for "The Only One" at a Music & Film event that she presented. It is a one-shot music video where Roquelin walks down a path while various men appear around her. At the end of the video, the guy she runs into turns out to be 'The One'. It was directed by Kyle Lavore, who has worked on films The Amazing Spider-Man and Men in Black III. "The Only One" is track number 5 on album "Beautiful Sun", a Rock song with alternative guitars, inspired in part by her past Rock music experience.

On 2 May 2014 she performed as the opening act for Bruce Sudano (producer for Michael Jackson, Dolly Parton and his wife Donna Summer) at The Bitter End.

During the summer of 2014 her Music Video "The Only One" screened at several Film Festivals: Rahway International Short Film Festival, Art All Night Trenton International Film Festival, 7th Annual Hamilton Music and Film Festival in Hamilton, Canada (Sept 28th), and at the 19th International Indie Gathering Festival where it was awarded "Best Pop Music Video". On 25 July, she headlined the Ginger New York Show LIVE on NYC's TV Networks MNN (Manhattan Neighborhood Network), hosted by Ms. Ginger Broderick (Good Day New York, WNBC, CNBC, CNN, Fox Business News, Bloomberg, NY1 and WOR Radio, The Wall Street Journal, Forbes, and Wealth Manager).

Roquelin's album "Beautiful Sun" was approved to be added to the Music Genome Project on Pandora Radio. As of August 2014, her videos had reached over 1 Million views on YouTube, with 680,000 views on her official YouTube channel.

On 16 September 2014 she released a Hip-Hop Remix of her song "Bliss of My Soul" featuring Bronx Native Rap Artist R.e.a.P. The track was remixed by Titus and mastered by Roman Vail at JLM Studios. R.e.a.P is also a Songwriter, Producer, and Engineer who worked at JAMBOX Entertainment with Pitbull (rapper), Ludacris, Nina Sky, Torch (American rapper) from Maybach Music Group (MMG), Idris Elba, and Hurricane Chris.

Songs from her album "Beautiful Sun" made it to the 57th Grammy Awards Ballot with the following entries: Best Arrangement, Instruments/Vocals "Thank You" (Acoustic), Best Pop Solo Performance: "Like A Feather", Record of The Year: "Thank You", Song of the Year: "Beautiful Sun", Best Rock Performance: "The Only One", Best Rock Song: "The Only One", Best Music Video: "The Only One".

In December 2014 Roquelin released a new Music Video "Like a Feather" animated by Indie Venture. The video was shown at a private Music, Film and Animation event that she presented in New York City with support from Asifa-East (International Animated Film Association, East Coast Chapter).

In March 2015, she released an indie-pop single entitled "Smile". The song is a collaboration between Roquelin (vocals, lyrics, vocal arrangements and music) and film composer Peter Lobo (drums, guitar, bass, piano, arrangements, music and production). Lobo has worked with Dawn Robinson (En Vogue), Yoko Ono, Whitney Houston, The Dave Matthews Band, Ziggy Marley, Blues Traveler and Marc DeSisto (Pink Floyd and U2).

"Thank You" by LiLi Roquelin is used for a solo dance routine, themed "The Woods" and performed by International Dancing Star Maddie Ziegler, also known as the Dancer for Sia Furler. It won 1st Place/ 1st Overall at the Sheer Talent Dance Competition at Spokane Convention Center in Washington State on 05/16/15 and aired on Dance Moms Season 5 Episode 29 on Lifetime on 28 July 2015. Maddie also performed the same number on 30 May at the Abby Lee Dance Company Los Angeles School Grand Opening and on 20 June at ALDC's Annual Showcase in Pittsburgh.

In November 2015 she wrote and released a song "Abolitionistas" produced by Titus, exclusively for Freedom Ladder, a non-profit organization which focuses on ending the trafficking of children. The Director of Freedom Ladder has been chosen as one of the New York Abolitionists with Tina Fey and Michael Bloomberg. The alternate version of the Song is called "Liberty".

Her "Like a Feather" Music Video was in the official selection of several Film Festivals, it received a Nomination for Best Short Film at the Golden Door International Film Festival and won "Rising Star Award" at the 11th Canada International Film Festival in April 2016.

In early 2016 she started working on an upcoming new album, spending a lot of time in studio sessions. In March, Roquelin launched a special "Every Other Monday Video" Playlist on her popular YouTube channel, with cover performance videos of "Dreams" (Fleetwood Mac), "Breathe Me" (Sia), "I've Got this Friend" (The Civil Wars), "And Your Bird Can Sing" (The Beatles), and a fan-favorite ukulele cover of The Offspring's "Why Don't You Get a Job?". She also plays the ukulele on her new performance video called "Petunia's Song" (September 2016), and describes her album in the works as having a different mood, being more upbeat but still with a lot of piano.

In April 2017 she performed new songs at a fundraising event at The Bitter End to help raise awareness and funds for Suicide Prevention and the American Foundation for Suicide Prevention.

In July 2018 her song "Don't You Know It's Christmas" (released December 2017) won Best Holiday Song Award at the American Songwriting Awards. "Don't You know it's Christmas" was on the official entry list for consideration at the 61st Annual Grammy Awards.

Roquelin released a new album "Be Inspired" on 6 December 2018, with a red-carpet event and live performance at The Bitter End in New York City with a band. She also released a Documentary offering a behind the scenes look into the work she put into producing the record. The album has a more upbeat mood and features piano, ukulele and four songs in French.

She selected and directed a total of 12 people while creating and managing the entire album: she wrote, composed, arranged the songs, recorded the vocals, piano and synths, directed the musicians, the mixing and mastering engineers. Brian Scheuble (Elton John, Sheryl Crow, Liz Phair) mixed the album and Grammy-nominated Joe Lambert (Moby, Sinead O'Connor) was the mastering engineer. She mentioned she “came across the idea many times that to make a good album or get some credibility a woman has to hide herself behind the name of a well-known male producer (...); less than 10% of record producers are women and this can be intimidating for girls”so she wants to “inspire all the women songwriters that if they have a vision they can do it too.”

LiLi Roquelin's signature sound has solidified in a mix of indie pop, folk, rock. In June 2019, she performed the American National Anthem at Citi Field, New York Mets. A few weeks later she also performed Live on Ukulele/piano accompanied by guitar and drums at the 13th annual Rockstock & Barrels surf, skate and music festival on Rockaway Beach, New York City.

She participated alongside Julian Lennon on a spoken-word track called "Voices of the People," which is part of the soundtrack album featuring Quincy Jones for the movie "One Little Finger", directed by Rupam Sarmah and released in Fall 2019.

On 28 February 2020, before New York City's public health crisis and COVID-19 pandemic confinement, she shot with her team the music video "Feel Good" which was then officially released on 5 May 2020 with the deluxe edition of “Be Inspired”.[63].

In the summer of 2020, Roquelin sang and appeared in a remote collaboration video led by Queen AndreYAH Black and Off-Broadway co-singer Phyllis Harris, featuring worldwide artists. The recording was directed and produced by multi Emmy award winning jazz pianist and composer, D.D. Jackson (who has worked with Questlove, The Roots, and who has performed at Madison Square Garden for the John Lennon 75th Birthday Concert and at Radio City Music Hall).

In August 2020, in an interview on "How Did I Get Here?", the podcast of Johnny Goudie, a staple of the Austin music scene, she talked about her uplifting latest album, "Be Inspired", and the need for a positive message during these uncertain times.

Discography

Albums
Neverending Sundown (with Hate Dies Hard) (2006)
Will you hate the rest of the world or will you renew your life? (2010) - Includes "Renew", "Keep This For You", "Sally's Song", "Should you Get Mad"
Beautiful Sun (2012) - Includes "Thank You", "Like a Feather", "The Only One"
Be Inspired (December 2018)
Be Inspired (Deluxe Edition) (May 2020)

EPs
LiLi Roquelin (2008) - Includes "Blues Alone", Music Video of "I Saw You"
2008 EP (Deluxe Edition) (2020) - Includes Exclusive Bonus Track dreamy acoustic version of "Blues Alone"

Singles and Side Projects
"I Saw You" (2008)
"Bliss of My Soul" Feat. R.e.a.P (Hip-Hop Remix) (2014)
"Smile" (LiLi Roquelin & Peter Lobo) (2015)
"Abolitionistas", "Liberty" (2015)
"Don't You Know It's Christmas" (2017)

References

External links
Official website

People from Astoria, Queens
Living people
21st-century American singers
French emigrants to the United States
Women rock singers
French women singers
People from Manhattan
American women singer-songwriters
American women pianists
Singers from New York City
Musicians from Toulon
Trip hop musicians
21st-century American guitarists
Year of birth missing (living people)
Guitarists from New York City
21st-century American women singers
Alternative rock singers
21st-century American pianists
21st-century American women guitarists
Singer-songwriters from New York (state)